Tommy Duggan (31 August 1897 – 30 November 1961) was an American soccer outside right who played in both the National Association Football League and American Soccer League. He is a member of the National Soccer Hall of Fame.
 
Duggan's early career is sketchy. He moved to the United States in 1911. The first team he is recorded as playing with is the Valley Boys, of an unknown league, in 1914. He then played for Babcock & Wilcox, West Hudson A.A. and Philadelphia Merchant Ship, all of the National Association Football League (NAFBL). He was with Babcock & Wilcox in December 1916. In March 1918, he was with West Hudson A.A. In 1921, the American Soccer League replaced the NAFBL. Duggan signed with the New York Field Club of the ASL and spent one season with them before bouncing from one team to another. He was with the Paterson F.C. in the 1922–1923 season, winning the 1923 National Challenge Cup, but was back with New York F.C. the next season. In 1924, the New York F.C. was sold to new ownership which renamed it Indiana Flooring. While Duggan began the season with Indiana, he moved to the New York Giants sixteen games into the season. Duggan then spent his longest time with an ASL team, not leaving the Giants until three games into the 1926–1927 season. He moved to the Newark Skeeters before moving to the New York Nationals for the start of the 1927–1928 season, but was back in Newark after only two games. He then played the 1929–1930 season with the New York Giants. According to the National Soccer Hall of Fame, he also played for Newark Portuguese.

Duggan was inducted into the National Soccer Hall of Fame in 1955.

References

External links
 National Soccer Hall of Fame profile

1897 births
1961 deaths
English footballers
National Association Football League players
Babcock & Wilcox F.C. players
West Hudson A.A. players
Philadelphia Merchant Ship players
American Soccer League (1921–1933) players
New York Field Club players
Paterson F.C. (NAFBL) players
Indiana Flooring players
New York Giants (soccer) players
Newark Skeeters players
New York Nationals (ASL) players
New York Giants (soccer, 1930–1932) players
Newark Portuguese players
National Soccer Hall of Fame members
Association football forwards
British emigrants to the United States